Awlad Hossain Chakladar (1950/51 – 4 February 2019) was a Bangladeshi freedom fighter, film producer and director.

Biography
Chakladar was a freedom fighter. He was the director of Nag Nortoki. This film was  Anjuman Ara Shilpi's debut film.
 He was the producer of Premik and Jogajog. In 1985 Premik won National Film Award in two categories. In 1988 Jogajog also won National Film Award in two categories.

Chakladar died on 4 February 2019 at the age of 68.

Selected filmography

Producer
 Din Mojur
 Premik
 Jogajog

Director
 Nag Nortoki

References

1950s births
2019 deaths
Bangladeshi film directors
Bangladeshi film producers
People of the Bangladesh Liberation War